The 1999 Belgian Supercup was a football match between the winners of the previous season's Belgian First Division and Belgian Cup competitions. The match was contested by Cup winners Lierse, and 1999–2000 Belgian First Division champions, Genk on 1 September 1999 at the ground of the league winners Genk, the Fenixstadium. Lierse won the cup after two late goals by Stein Huysegems.

Prior to the match, Genk coach Jos Heyligen criticised the timing of the match during the week of international matches, as five players in his squad were unavailable due to being called-up for their respective national team, namely Branko Strupar, Marc Hendrikx, Ferenc Horváth, Þórður Guðjónsson and Bjarni Guðjónsson. With several others injured, the Genk squad for the Super Cup included only 13 first team players together with four youngsters from the U23 squad. From Lierse side, absentees due to call-ups were Jurgen Cavens and Carl Hoefkens.

Details

See also
1998–99 Belgian First Division
1998–99 Belgian Cup

References

Belgian Super Cup, 1999
Belgian Supercup
K.R.C. Genk matches
Lierse S.K.
September 1999 sports events in Europe